Dwight Edwin Stones (born December 6, 1953) is an American television commentator and a two-time Olympic bronze medalist and former three-time world record holder in the men's high jump. During his 16-year career, he won 19 national championships. In 1984, Stones became the first athlete to both compete and serve as an announcer at the same Olympics. Since then, he has been a color analyst for all three major networks in the United States and continues to cover track and field on television. He served as an analyst for NBC Sports coverage of Track and Field at the 2008 Summer Olympics.

Biography
He set his first world record the following summer when he cleared , also at Munich. That jump also made him the first "flop" jumper to set a world record, five years after Dick Fosbury made that style famous while winning the gold medal at the 1968 Summer Olympics in Mexico City.
 
Stones attended UCLA his freshman year (1971–72), and later transferred to Long Beach State for a year and a half, and is a member of that university's hall of fame.

In 1994, Stones hosted the second season of the ESPN game show Dream League.

In 1998, Stones was inducted into the National Track and Field Hall of Fame.  He was a 1991 inductee into the Orange County Hall of Fame.

Stones is Jewish, and he once competed in the Maccabiah Games in Israel.

Olympic competition

Stones was one of the world's top high jumpers from 1972 to 1984 and has been twice named the World Indoor Athlete of the Year by Track & Field News.

At age 18, during the 1972 Summer Olympics in Munich, he took the bronze medal in the high jump behind Jüri Tarmak and Stefan Junge.

At the 1976 Summer Olympics in Montréal, he was a heavy favorite to win the gold medal. Earlier, he finished second at the U.S. Olympic Trials, then had to settle for another Olympic bronze behind Jacek Wszola and local favorite Greg Joy when his jumping ability was hampered by the competition being struck by heavy rain.

His participation at the Montreal Games sparked a heated debate: he had allegedly said that he hated French Canadians (Montréal-Matin Newspaper, July 29, 1976, pages 5 and 8) when he criticised the organization of the Games in a media interview. Consequently, Stones was subject to raucous booing and hissing during the competition.

The debate became so inflamed that he decided on a new tee-shirt for the day of the final, the back of the shirt reading "I love French Canadians", which officials asked him to take off.  The Americans in the audience responded to the treatment of Stones by booing Claude Ferragne, a French-Canadian jumper, during the event.

After missing 1980 Olympics in Moscow due to the American-led boycott, Stones returned to the Games at age 30 in 1984 in Los Angeles, and finished fourth. He cleared 2.31 m, but lost the bronze medal to Zhu Jianhua on the countback. His distant cousin, Doug Nordquist, finished 5th, clearing 2.29 m.

Professionalism
In the transitional time when amateur sports were beginning to break the barrier of payment to athletes, Stones was a leading advocate of the change.  During that period, one of the first options was for winnings to be paid to the athlete's club.  To answer that, Stones created the Desert Oasis Track Club, a California corporation.    The only athlete in the club was Dwight Stones.  The stockholders and officers were Dwight Stones and his family members.  Stones first made money in the televised sports creation Superstars which was "donated" to the track club.  This caused the IAAF and its American affiliate the AAU to suspend Stones.  The ensuing lawsuit led to the Amateur Sports Act of 1978, which broke up the AAU, decertifying it as the national governing body for track and field (and many other sports) causing the formation of The Athletics Congress and the slow transition to allow professionalism.

Records held 

 World Record: High Jump –  on July 11, 1973
 World Record: High Jump –   on June 5, 1976
 World Record: High Jump –   on August 4, 1976
 American Record: High Jump –  on June 24, 1984

Championships 
1984
 1984 Olympic Games: High Jump (4th)
 1984 U.S. Olympic Trials: High Jump – 2.34 m (1st)
1983
 1983 TAC Outdoor Championships: High Jump (1st)
 1983 TAC Indoor Championships: High Jump (3rd)
1982
 1982 TAC Indoor Championships: High Jump (1st)
1980
 1980 AAU Outdoor Championships: High Jump (3rd)
1978
 1978 AAU Outdoor Championships: High Jump (1st)
1977
 1977 World Cup: High Jump (2nd)
 1977 AAU Indoor Championships: High Jump (1st)
 1977 USTFF Outdoor Championships: High Jump (1st)
 1977 AAU Outdoor Championships: High Jump (1st)
1976
 1976 Summer Olympics: High Jump (3rd – bronze medal)
 1976 U.S. Olympic Trials: High Jump (2nd)
 1976 USTFF Outdoor Championships: High Jump (1st)
 1976 AAU Outdoor Championships: High Jump (1st)
 1976 NCAA Outdoor Championships:  High Jump – 2.31 m (1st)
 1976 NCAA Indoor Championships: High Jump (1st)(Cal State Long Beach)

1975
 1975 USTFF Indoor Championships: High Jump (1st)
 1975 USTFF Outdoor Championships: High Jump (1st)
 1975 AAU Indoor Championships: High Jump (1st)
 1975 AAU Outdoor Championships: High Jump (3rd)
1974
 1974 USTFF Indoor Championships: High Jump (1st)
 1974 AAU Outdoor Championships: High Jump (1st)
1973
 1973 USTFF Indoor Championships: High Jump (1st)
 1973 USTFF Outdoor Championships: High Jump (1st)
 1973 AAU Indoor Championships: High Jump (1st)
 1973 AAU Outdoor Championships: High Jump (1st)
1972
 1972 Summer Olympics: High Jump – 2.21 m (3rd – bronze medal)
 1972 U.S. Olympic Trials: High Jump – 2.21 m (1st)
 1972 NCAA Outdoor Championships: High Jump (3rd)(UCLA)

References

External links 

 
 
 
 
 

1953 births
Living people
American game show hosts
American male high jumpers
Athletes (track and field) at the 1972 Summer Olympics
Athletes (track and field) at the 1976 Summer Olympics
Athletes (track and field) at the 1984 Summer Olympics
California State University, Long Beach alumni
Olympic bronze medalists for the United States in track and field
World record setters in athletics (track and field)
Jewish American sportspeople
UCLA Bruins men's track and field athletes
Long Beach State Beach men's track and field athletes
American masters athletes
Track and field broadcasters
Track and field athletes from California
Medalists at the 1976 Summer Olympics
Medalists at the 1972 Summer Olympics
Track and field people from California
21st-century American Jews